The Arizona State Soccer Association (ASSA) is the governing body of soccer in the state of Arizona.

References

External links
 Arizona State Soccer Association official site

State Soccer Associations
Soccer in Arizona
1966 establishments in Arizona
Organizations based in Arizona
Sports organizations established in 1966
Organizations based in Phoenix, Arizona